Clinidium mexicanum is a species of ground beetle in the subfamily Rhysodinae. It was described by Louis Alexandre Auguste Chevrolat in 1873. It is endemic to the southern part of the Mexican Plateau. Clinidium mexicanum measure  in length.

References

Clinidium
Beetles of North America
Endemic insects of Mexico
Beetles described in 1873
Taxa named by Louis Alexandre Auguste Chevrolat